The 2012 Open GDF Suez de Cagnes-sur-Mer Alpes-Maritimes was a professional tennis tournament played on clay courts. It was the fifteenth edition of the tournament which was part of the 2012 ITF Women's Circuit. It took place in Cagnes-sur-Mer, France between 7 and 13 May 2012.

WTA entrants

Seeds

 1 Rankings are as of April 30, 2012.

Other entrants
The following players received wildcards into the singles main draw:
  Caroline Garcia
  Victoria Larrière
  Kristina Mladenovic
  Aravane Rezaï

The following players received entry from the qualifying draw:
  Vesna Dolonts
  Yulia Putintseva
  Petra Rampre
  Laura Robson

The following players received entry by a Junior Exempt:
  Irina Khromacheva

Champions

Singles

 Yulia Putintseva def.  Patricia Mayr-Achleitner, 6–2, 6–1

Doubles

 Alexandra Panova /  Urszula Radwańska def.  Katalin Marosi /  Renata Voráčová, 7–5, 4–6, [10–6]

External links

ITF Search
Official Website

Open GDF Suez de Cagnes-sur-Mer Alpes-Maritimes
May 2012 sports events in Europe
2012 in French tennis
Open de Cagnes-sur-Mer